Hall of Fame: A Tribute to Bob Marley's 50th Anniversary is an album by Bunny Wailer, released through RAS Records in November 1995. In 1997, the album won Wailer the Grammy Award for Grammy Award for Best Reggae Album.

Reception

Track listing
All songs by Bob Marley and Bunny Wailer, unless noted otherwise.

 Disc 1
 "Profile" – 0:40
 "Roots" – 4:02
 "Chant Down Babylon" – 3:21
 "Forever Loving Jah" – 4:00
 "Three Little Birds" – 3:25
 "Trench Town" – 3:24
 "Rastaman Vibration (PositiveVibration)" – 3:08
 "Roots, Rock, Reggae" – 3:24
 "Johnny Was a Good Man (Johnny Was)" – 3:02
 "Want More" – 3:01
 "No More Trouble" (Marley) – 3:19
 "Africa Unite" – 2:20
 "One Drop" – 3:27
 "Ambush" – 2:43
 "Wake up and Live" (Davis, Marley) – 3:32
 "Can't Stop Them Now (Real Situation)" – 2:39
 "Bad Card" – 3:13
 "Mi and Dem (We and Them)" – 2:51
 "Work" – 2:51
 "Rasta Dread (Natty Dread)" – 3:46
 "Bend Down Low" (Marley) – 3:22
 "Talking Blues" – 3:43
 "Blackman Redemption" (Marley, Perry) – 3:10
 "Sun Is Shining" – 3:15
 "Man to Man (Who the Cap Fit)" – 3:27

 Disc 2
 "Stiff Neck Fool" – 3:16
 "Pimper's Paradise" – 2:26
 "Jump Nyahbinghi" – 3:07
 "Mix Up" – 3:11
 "Give Thanks and Praise" – 2:51
 "Trouble in the World (So Much Trouble)" – 3:05
 "Zion Train" – 3:14
 "Rastaman Rides Again (Ride Natty Ride)" – 2:47
 "Judge Not" – 2:40
 "Fancy Curls" – 2:32
 "Zimbabwe" (Marley) – 3:14
 "Winnepress (Babylon System)" – 3:06
 "Rat Race" – 2:48
 "Revolution" – 2:18
 "Top Rankin'" – 2:20
 "Rainbow Country" – 3:22
 "Simmer Down" – 3:02
 "Running Away" – 3:05
 "Guiltness" – 2:55
 "Craven Choke Puppy" – 2:32
 "Natural Mystic" – 2:41
 "So Much Things to Say" – 2:39
 "Survivors (Survival)" – 1:52
 "One Love" – 2:49
 "Lively Up Yourself" – 4:06
 "Small Axe" – 3:40
 "Final Statement" – 2:59

Personnel

 Carl Ayton – drums, percussion
 Barrington Bailey – horn, keyboards
 Aston Barrett – bass
 Christopher Birch – keyboards
 Winston Bowen – guitar
 Lloyd Denton – keyboards
 Sly Dunbar – drums, percussion
 Bobby Ellis – horn
 Michael Fletcher – bass
 Everton Gayle – horn
 Flabba Holt – bass
 Hugh Malcolm – drums
 Junior Marvin – guitar
 Johnny "Dizzy" Moore – horn
 Dwight Pinkney – guitar
 Owen Reid – guitar
 Mikey "Boo" Richards – drums
 Style Scott – drums
 Robbie Shakespeare – bass
 Roger Steffens – liner Notes
 Keith Sterling – keyboards, percussion
 Danny Thompson – bass
 Bunny Wailer – arranger, director, keyboards, percussion, producer, vocals, backing vocals
 Mallory Williams – keyboards
 Lloyd "Gitsy" Willis – guitar

References

1995 albums
Bob Marley tribute albums
Bunny Wailer albums
Grammy Award for Best Reggae Album